The Kapaz PFK 2016–17 season was Kapaz's fifth Azerbaijan Premier League season, and eighth season since their reformation in 2009. It is their second season with Shahin Diniyev as manager, during which they finished the season fifth, were knocked out of the Azerbaijan Cup by Inter Baku at the Quarterfinal stage and reached the Second qualifying round of the UEFA Europa League before defeat to Admira Wacker Mödling.

Squad

Transfers

Summer

In:

Out:

Winter

In:

Out:

Competitions

Azerbaijan Premier League

Results summary

Results

League table

Azerbaijan Cup

UEFA Europa League

Qualifying rounds

Squad statistics

Appearances and goals

|-
|colspan="14"|Players who appeared for Kapaz but left during the season:
|}

Goal scorers

Disciplinary record

Notes

References

External links 
 Official website
 Kapaz FC's Facebook page
 Kapaz PFK  at PFL.AZ

Kapaz PFK seasons
Azerbaijani football clubs 2016–17 season
Kapaz